Kryachki is a rural locality (a selo) in Mokroolkhovskoye Rural Settlement, Kotovsky District, Volgograd Oblast, Russia. The population was 343 as of 2010. There are 8 streets.

Geography 
Kryachki is located in steppe, on Volga Upland, 37 km northeast of Kotovo (the district's administrative centre) by road. Netkachevo is the nearest rural locality.

References 

Rural localities in Kotovsky District